The Grammy Award for Best Instrumental Performance was awarded from 1964 to 1967. The award had several minor name changes:

From 1964 to 1965, the award was known as Best Instrumental Performance - Non-Jazz
In 1966, it was called the Best Instrumental Performance (Other Than Jazz)
In 1967, it was just Best Instrumental Performance

Although in the pop category of Grammy Awards, the award did not specify popular music performances. Since 1969, a specific pop award has been presented: Best Pop Instrumental Performance. Years reflect the year in which the Grammy Awards were presented, for works released in the previous year..

Recipients

References

See also
 Grammy Award for Best Classical Performance – Instrumental Soloist or Soloists (with or without orchestra)
 Grammy Award for Best Hard Rock/Metal Performance Vocal or Instrumental
 Grammy Award for Best Instrumental Soloist Performance (without orchestra)
 Grammy Award for Best Instrumental Soloist(s) Performance (with orchestra)
 Grammy Award for Best Improvised Jazz Solo
 Grammy Award for Best Pop Instrumental Performance with Vocal Coloring
 Grammy Award for Best Country Instrumental Performance
 Grammy Award for Best Pop Instrumental Performance
 Grammy Award for Best R&B Instrumental Performance
 Grammy Award for Best Rock Instrumental Performance

Instrumental Performance
Awards established in 1964
Awards disestablished in 1967